Rhys Anthony Vague (born 17 January 1996) is an Australian professional basketball player for the Kagawa Five Arrows of the Japanese B.League. He made his debut for his hometown Perth Wildcats in the NBL as a development player in 2014. After four seasons as a development player, he was elevated to a fully contracted player in 2018. In his six seasons with the Wildcats, he was a part of four championship teams in 2016, 2017, 2019 and 2020. Vague also made a name for himself in the State Basketball League (SBL), playing for the Cockburn Cougars, East Perth Eagles and Stirling Senators, earning the SBL's Most Improved Player in 2015.

Early life
Vague grew up in the Perth suburb of Kardinya. He played his first game of basketball at the age of seven, starting at the Spearwood Hawks Junior Basketball Club before joining the Cockburn Cougars junior program. He is also a product of the rich basketball program at Willetton Senior High School. He barracked for the Perth Wildcats, idolised the players and dreamt of playing for the club.

Basketball career

SBL, SEABL and NZNBL (2013–2019)

Vague made his SBL debut for the Cockburn Cougars in 2013 at the age of 17. He appeared in two games in his first season. He continued on with the Cougars in 2014 and averaged 3.7 points and 2.8 rebounds in 16 games. He also had a three-game stint with the Basketball Australia Centre of Excellence in the SEABL midway through the year.

Vague joined the East Perth Eagles for the 2015 SBL season. In 22 games, he averaged 18.2 points, 10.0 rebounds and 2.1 assists per game. He was subsequently named the SBL's Most Improved Player. He re-joined the Eagles in 2016 and appeared in all 26 games, averaging 19.0 points, 11.0 rebounds and 3.2 assists per game.

Vague joined the Stirling Senators for the 2017 SBL season. In 28 games, he averaged 18.0 points, 8.29 rebounds and 3.18 assists per game.

Vague moved east in 2018 to play for the Dandenong Rangers in the SEABL. In his debut for the Rangers, he scored a season-high 33 points. In 19 games, he averaged 15.8 points, 7.7 rebounds and 1.7 assists per game.

On 5 March 2019, Vague signed with the Nelson Giants for the 2019 New Zealand NBL season. In his debut for the Giants on 13 April 2019, Vague scored 21 points in a 93–78 season-opening win over the Taranaki Mountainairs. On 7 June, he scored 26 points in a 102–81 win over the Super City Rangers. He appeared in all 18 games for the Giants, averaging 16.8 points, 8.5 rebounds and 2.2 assists per game.

Perth Wildcats (2014–2020)

Following the 2014 SBL season, Vague began training with the Perth Wildcats during the NBL pre-season before earning selection as a development player. He made his debut for the Wildcats on 24 October 2014 at Perth Arena. He received 45 seconds of action deep into the game against the Sydney Kings, a match the Wildcats won 84–63. Vague was active for three more games during the 2014–15 season, but did not appear in any further action. He appeared in six games during the 2015–16 season and was a member of the team's championship-winning squad. He did not appear in a game during the 2016–17 season, with the Wildcats claiming back-to-back championships. In 2017–18, he played in a then career-high 13 NBL games, averaging 1.5 points.

On 19 April 2018, Vague signed a two-year deal with the Wildcats, earning elevation to the team's full-time roster after four years as a development player. On 17 January 2019, on his 23rd birthday, Vague made his first career start, recording 10 points, five rebounds and four assists in 25 minutes in a 97–84 loss to the Adelaide 36ers. In March 2019, he was a member of the Wildcats' championship-winning team. In March 2020, he was crowned an NBL champion for the fourth time in five years.

Kagawa Five Arrows and Hawke's Bay Hawks (2020–present)
In July 2020, Vague signed with the Kagawa Five Arrows of the Japanese B.League for the 2020–21 season. In 50 games, he averaged 10.0 points, 8.8 rebounds and 1.8 assists per game.

In May 2021, Vague joined the Hawke's Bay Hawks for the 2021 New Zealand NBL season.

On 18 June 2021, Vague re-signed with the Five Arrows for the 2021–22 season. He averaged 12.8 points per game.

On 8 June 2022, Vague re-signed with the Five Arrows for the 2022–23 season.

National team career
In December 2013, Vague won a silver medal with Australia at the FIBA Oceania Pacific Championships in New Zealand.

In December 2014, Vague won a gold medal with the Australian Emus at the FIBA Oceania Under 19 Championships in Fiji. In April 2015, he was named in a 16-man Australian Emus squad in the lead up to the 2015 FIBA Under-19 World Championships in Greece, but ultimately missed out on the final squad.

In June 2017, Vague was named in the 12-man Emerging Boomers squad for the 2017 Summer Universiade in Taiwan. The team consisted of players under the age of 25 who were completing university studies.

In February 2022, Vague was named in a 17-man Australian Boomers squad ahead of the FIBA World Cup Qualifiers in Japan. He re-joined the team later that year for the next qualifying window.

References

External links

Kagawa Five Arrows profile
FIBA profile
SEABL stats
"Promoted Perth Wildcat Rhys Vague sets sights on bumper pre-season" at thewest.com.au
"Vague the catalyst in breakout performance" at wildcats.com.au

1996 births
Living people
Australian expatriate basketball people in Japan
Australian men's basketball players
Basketball players from Perth, Western Australia
Forwards (basketball)
Hawke's Bay Hawks players
Kagawa Five Arrows players
Nelson Giants players
Perth Wildcats players